The Ministry of Social Security Act 1966 was a piece of legislation passed by the United Kingdom Parliament to establish the Supplementary Benefits Scheme whereby the National Assistance Board was transformed into the Supplementary Benefit Board. By merging this with the Ministry of Pensions and National Insurance, the new Ministry of Social Security was created. The Act received Royal Assent on 3 August 1966.

References

United Kingdom Acts of Parliament 1966
Social security in the United Kingdom